The 1973 Japan rugby union tour of England, Wales and France was a series of eleven matches played by the Japan national rugby union team in Wales, England and France in September and October 1973. The Japanese team won only of two of their matches and lost the other nine. Neither Wales nor France awarded full international caps for their games against Japan.

Matches
Scores and results list Japan's points tally first.

In popular culture
The good-natured and friendly mood of the tour was captured by Max Boyce in the song "Asso Asso Yogoshi" on the album Live at Treorchy.

References

Japan rugby union tour
Japan national rugby union team tours
Japan 1973
Japan 1973
Japan 1973
Tour
Tour
Tour
Tour
Japan
Japan
Japan